Bob Hirst (12 October 1941 – 25 July 2008) was an Australian rules footballer who played with North Melbourne in the Victorian Football League (VFL).

Notes

External links 

1941 births
2008 deaths
Australian rules footballers from Victoria (Australia)
North Melbourne Football Club players
Western Magpies Australian Football Club players
People educated at Wesley College (Victoria)